Charactoceras is a tarphycerid genus cephalopod which lived during the Late Ordovician.

Charactoceras has a closely coiled, rapidly expanding evolute shell, dorsally impressed, with a flattened venter and rounded sides. Sutures are close spaced laterally, but with broad ventral and dorsal lobes. Hyponomic sinus is well developed. The siphuncle is cyrtochoanitic and empty, located between the center and venter; segments expanded slightly into the chambers.

The genus Charactocerina from the Late Orovician is similar but has costae on the dorsolateral region of the shell.  Both are included in the family Aspidoceratidae.  Also somewhat similar to Charactoceras in external form are Uranoceras and Cumingsoceras from the Middle Silurian, but both differ in detail.

References

 Walter C. Sweet, 1964. Nautiloidea- Barrandeocerida; Treatise on Invertebrate Paleontology. Geological Society of America and University of Kansas Press.

Prehistoric nautiloid genera
Paleozoic life of Manitoba
Paleozoic life of the Northwest Territories
Paleozoic life of Nunavut
Paleozoic life of Quebec